Labdia irimetalla is a moth in the family Cosmopterigidae. It was described by Edward Meyrick in 1933. It is known from the Democratic Republic of the Congo.

References

Labdia
Moths described in 1933